Midway is an unincorporated community in Floyd County, Iowa, United States.

References

Unincorporated communities in Floyd County, Iowa
Unincorporated communities in Iowa